The American Indian Library Association (AILA) awards are presented every two years to recognize the most outstanding contributions to children's literature by and about American Indians. The awards were established as a way to identify and honor the very best writing and illustrations by and about American Indians. Books selected to receive the award will present American Indians in the fullness of their humanity in the present and past contexts.

History
The first American Indian Library Association American Indian Youth Literature Awards were presented during the Joint Conference of Librarians of Color in 2006.

Criteria
 Authors (for illustrated books, both author AND illustrator) must be recognized by the Native community of which they claim to be a part and be connected to the people of that community.
 For anthologies, at least ⅔ of the authors must be recognized members of the community to which they claim affiliation.
 Books must have been published after October of the year before the last awards were given (i.e., the odd-numbered year preceding the previous award cycle; after October 2017 for the 2020 awards, etc.).
 Indigenous-language text and audio materials are encouraged, and every effort will be made to provide accurate translation for the committee when possible, but the committee’s common language is English.
 Books may be nominated for consideration by the AIYLA Jury, publishers, librarians, authors, illustrators, and others.
 The Awards go beyond merely naming the best creator of a particular art form in a certain year to representing the ideals of our multiple communities. Native authors and illustrators are role models for young people. For that reason, AILA does not endorse authors who appropriate other cultures or who behave in ways that dishonor others. 

Up to 5 honor books may be selected in each category.

Recipients

See also

References

External links
 

American children's literary awards
 
Young adult literature awards
Native American literary awards
Awards established in 2006
2006 establishments in the United States